NGC 1365, also known as the Great Barred Spiral Galaxy, is a  double-barred spiral galaxy about 56 million light-years away in the constellation Fornax.

Characteristics 
NGC 1365 is a barred spiral galaxy in the Fornax cluster. Within the larger long bar stretching across the center of the galaxy appears to be a smaller bar that comprises the core, with an apparent size of about 50″ × 40″. This second bar is more prominent in infrared images of the central region of the galaxy, and likely arises from a combination of dynamical instabilities of stellar orbits in the region, along with gravity, density waves, and the overall rotation of the disc. The inner bar structure likely rotates as a whole more rapidly than the larger long bar, creating the diagonal shape seen in images. 

The spiral arms extend in a wide curve north and south from the ends of the east-west bar and form an almost ring like Z-shaped halo.  Astronomers think NGC 1365's prominent bar plays a crucial role in the galaxy's evolution, drawing gas and dust into a star-forming maelstrom and ultimately feeding material into the central black hole.

NGC 1365, including its two outer spiral arms, spreads over around 200,000 light-years. Different parts of the galaxy take different times to make a full rotation around the core of the galaxy, with the outer parts of the bar completing one circuit in about 350 million years. NGC 1365 and other galaxies of its type have come to more prominence in recent years with new observations indicating that the Milky Way could also be a barred spiral galaxy. Such galaxies are quite common — two thirds of spiral galaxies are barred according to recent estimates, and studying others can help astronomers understand our own galactic home.

Supernovae 

2012fr on October 27 2012, 2001du on August 24 2001, SN 1983V on November 25 1983, and 1957C were all supernovae observed in NGC 1365.

Supermassive black hole 
The central supermassive black hole in the active nucleus, which has a mass of about 2 million solar masses, rotates at close to the speed of light. These observations, announced in February 2013, were made using the X-ray telescope satellite NuSTAR.

See also
 NGC 1300
 NGC 1097

References

External links

An Elegant Galaxy in an Unusual Light — ESO press release 22 September 2010
The Great Barred Spiral Galaxy
Fine Details in a Barred Galaxy — ESO press release 27 February 1999
Starry Bulges Yield Secrets to Galaxy Growth — Hubble Space Telescope press release October 6, 1999 01:00 PM (EDT)
Starry bulges yield secrets to galaxy growth Lars Lindberg Christensen, ESA/Hubble news release 6 October 1999
Supermassive Black Hole Spins Super-Fast (Release No.: 2013-07 : February 27, 2013)
NASA's NuSTAR Helps Solve Riddle of Black Hole Spin NuSTAR Feb 27, 2013
EXTREME X-RAY VARIABILITY AND ABSORPTION IN NGC 1365  XMM-Newton

NGC 1365 at Constellation Guide

Barred spiral galaxies
Seyfert galaxies
Luminous infrared galaxies
Fornax Cluster
1365
13179
Fornax (constellation)
Articles containing video clips